Luxembourg and Vietnam established diplomatic relations in 1973. Luxembourg's representation in Vietnam is through its embassy in Bangkok, Thailand. Vietnam is represented through its embassy in Brussels, Belgium.

Mutual international support 
In December 2008, Vietnam called on Luxembourg to support its ties with European Union. For its part, Vietnam is backing Luxembourg's candidacy for the post of non-permanent member at the UN Security Council.

Trade links 
Vietnam is one of the ten key countries in Luxembourg's development cooperation program. The countries have agreed to build a legal framework to facilitate business ties. At a meeting between Vietnamese Prime Minister Nguyễn Tấn Dũng and his Luxembourg counterpart, Jean-Claude Juncker, in September 2006, the two Prime Ministers agreed the need to boost bilateral trade ties based on the combination of Luxembourg's advanced technology and Vietnam's intensive labour force. Nguyễn Tấn Dũng, in October 2007, praised the cooperation by Luxembourg companies in finance and education and expressed the wish to boost bilateral ties with Luxembourg in these areas. In December 2008, according to Vietnam National Assembly Chairman Nguyễn Phú Trọng, there was still much potential for further economic and commercial co-operation.

Development Cooperation 
Luxembourg pledged EUR35 million in aid for the 2002-05 period.

See also 
 Foreign relations of Luxembourg
 Foreign relations of Vietnam
 Vietnam–EU relations

References

Further reading 
 Luxembourg, Vietnamese Ministry of Foreign Affairs, Vietnam visa from Luxembourg
 Official website of Luxembourg Development Cooperation 
 Homepage of Luxembourg Embassy in Thailand
 Facebook page of Luxembourg Embassy to Vietnam

Vietnam 
Bilateral relations of Vietnam